Francisco Borja da Costa (October 14, 1946 – December 8, 1975) was an East Timorese poet and the writer of "Pátria", the national anthem of East Timor.

Career
Born in October 1946, he wrote the majority of his work in Tetum. Borja da Costa was executed by Indonesian forces on December 8, 1975, the day after the beginning of the Indonesian invasion of East Timor. The national anthem's composer, Afonso Redentor Araujo, was also executed by the Indonesians 4 years later. Aside from the East Timorese national anthem, his most famous known work may be the poem "Um Minuto de Silêncio".

References

External links

1975 deaths
East Timorese poets
National anthem writers
1946 births
Tetum language